
Gmina Nawojowa is a rural gmina (administrative district) in Nowy Sącz County, Lesser Poland Voivodeship, in southern Poland.

Villages
Gmina Nawojowa contains the villages and settlements of Bącza Kunina, Frycowa, Homrzyska, Nawojowa, Popardowa, Żeleźnikowa Mała, Żeleźnikowa Wielka and Złotne.

Neighbouring gminas
Gmina Nawojowa is bordered by the city of Nowy Sącz and by the gminas of Kamionka Wielka, Łabowa, Piwniczna-Zdrój, Rytro and Stary Sącz.

References
Polish official population figures 2006

Nawojowa
Nowy Sącz County